Pungudutivu or Pungai Idu Tivu is a small island composed of number villages that is just west of the Jaffna Peninsula in Sri Lankan Tamil dominated Northern Province. It is divided into 12 wards internally, each corresponding a major settlement.

Nearly 15 Tamil schools exist there for the benefits of the place. Government hospitals and some private clinics are also available. Pungudutivu is connected by road with mainland Jaffna. SLTB and private buses travel through the island along the Jaffna - Kurikattuvan route. People take a boat from Kurikattuvan to reach Nainativu,  which is celebrated for its religious popularity.

History

The island was named as Middleburg by the Dutch colonial rulers during their occupation of then Ceylon.

Hindu Temples
Most of the residents of the Island are Tamils with majority being Hindus and a minority of Christians. There are a lot of Hindu temples in this region along with some Christian churches.

The island is also home to the famous Kannaki ambal temple (Recently renamed and rebranded as Sri Raja Rajeshwari ambal). The temple's history dictates that on one fateful day, a box floated towards the island and settled toward the shore. Cows began to crowd around the box and seeing this, local fishermen went near to the box and discovered an idol of the goddess Kannagi. The fishermen lifted the idol out of the box and as they were carrying it, the idol began to get heavy. Sensing the idol's divinity, the fishermen placed it near a hibiscus tree. Despite numerous attempt to lift the idol, the fishermen were unsuccessful. News regarding the mysterious idol began to spread like wildfire within the village. Village members and heads gathered to examine the idol and suddenly an old woman amongst the crowd entered a trance and revealed the following. "I am Kannaki Amman, I have come to this island with the protection of goddess bhadrakali. I have incarnated myself into seven and will travel to other regions in Sri Lanka, while I the main form, will reside in this village. Build me a temple and seek my grace, I will protect you all as a mother." Hearing this the villagers decided to build a temple for the goddess and another temple for goddess Bhadrakali. Over time, the temple has continued to grow in name and fame. The goddess is considered to be a very powerful deity and those who venerate her with full devotion have asserted that she never fails to listens and respond to her devotees plight.

Sri Lankan Civil War
It has been the subject and victim of wartime sexual violence by members of the Sri Lankan Navy who used sexual violence as a means of war during the Sri Lankan Civil War.  Prominent cases include Sarathambal and Ilayathambi Tharsini. The civil war has also led a large number of people to migrate out of the Island throughout the world.

References

External links
 Map of Pungudutivu
 Pungudutivu Welfare Association UK
 Pungudutivu Temples

 
Islands of Jaffna District
Island South DS Division